This is a list of countries showing past life expectancy, ranging from 1950 to 2015 in five-year periods, as estimated by the 2017 revision of the World Population Prospects database by the United Nations Population Division. Life expectancy equals the average number of years a person born in a given country is expected to live if mortality rates at each age were to remain steady in the future. The life expectancy is shown as the average of males and females.

List of countries 1950 to 2015 (United Nations) 

* indicates "Health in COUNTRY or TERRITORY" links.

References

External links 
United Nations, Department of Economic and Social Affairs – Population Division – World Population Prospects, the 2017 Revision
Our World in Data, Life expectancy
https://www.worldlifeexpectancy.com/history-of-life-expectancy

Life expectancy, past
Life expectancy, past
Past life expectancy